The African pygmy kingfisher (Ispidina picta) is a small insectivorous kingfisher found in the Afrotropics, mostly in woodland habitats.

Taxonomy
The African pygmy kingfisher was described by the French polymath Georges-Louis Leclerc, Comte de Buffon in 1780 in his Histoire Naturelle des Oiseaux. The bird was also illustrated in a hand-coloured plate engraved by François-Nicolas Martinet in the Planches Enluminées D'Histoire Naturelle which was produced under the supervision of Edme-Louis Daubenton to accompany Buffon's text.  Neither the plate caption nor Buffon's description included a scientific name but in 1783 the Dutch naturalist Pieter Boddaert coined the binomial name Todier de Juida in his catalogue of the Planches Enluminées. The type locality is Saint Louis, Senegal. The African pygmy kingfisher is now placed in the genus Ispidina that was introduced by the German naturalist Johann Jakob Kaup in 1848. The specific epithet picta is from the Latin pictus meaning "painted". Some texts refer to this species as Ceyx pictus.

There are three subspecies:
 I. p. picta (Boddaert, 1783) – Senegal and Gambia to Ethiopia and south to Uganda
 I. p. ferrugina Clancey, 1984 – Guinea-Bissau to west Uganda and south to Angola, Zambia and north Tanzania
 I. p. natalensis (Smith, A, 1832) – south Angola to central Tanzania south to north and east South Africa

Description
The sexes are alike. It is a very small kingfisher with rufous underparts and a blue back extending down to the tail. The dark blue crown of the adult separates it from the African dwarf kingfisher. The smaller size and violet wash on the ear coverts distinguish it from the similar malachite kingfisher.

The natalensis subspecies occurring in the south of the range has paler underparts and a blue spot above the white ear patch. Juveniles have less extensive violet on their ear coverts and a black rather than orange bill. 
The call is a high-pitched insect-like "tsip-tsip" given in flight.

Distribution and habitat
The African pygmy kingfisher is distributed widely in Africa south of the Sahara, where it is a common resident and intra-African migrant. It is absent from much of the horn of Africa, and also the drier western regions of Southern Africa.  It is found in woodland, savanna and coastal forest, and it is not bound to water. It is usually found either singly or in pairs and is secretive and unobtrusive.

Behaviour

Breeding
African pygmy kingfishers nest in burrows that are dug by both sexes in sandy soil banks or into a ground termite nest. The clutch is four to six white eggs. Both parents care for the young. They can have several broods in a year.

Feeding
The African pygmy kingfisher's diet consists of insects like grasshoppers, praying mantis, worms, crickets, dragonflies, cockroaches and moths. They are also known to take spiders which make up quite a large part of their diet. They also take geckos and lizards that are easily their length and small frogs and even occasionally small crabs. Prey are hunted from low perches and once caught are either crushed in the beak or smashed against the perch.

Gallery

References

Sasol Birds of Southern Africa by Ian Sinclair, Phil Hockey and Warwick Tarboton - Published by Struik 1997 - 
Birds of Africa south of the Sahara by Ian Sinclair and Peter Ryan - Published by Struik 2003 - 
Clancey, P.A. 1997 Pygmy Kingfisher Ispidina picta. In: The atlas of southern African birds. Vol 1: Non-passerines. Harrison, J.A., Allan, D.G., Underhill, L.G., Herremans, M., Tree, A.J., Parker, V. & Brown, C,J.(eds), pp. 648–649. Birdlife South Africa, Johannesburg.

External links

 (African) Pygmy Kingfisher - Species text in The Atlas of Southern African Birds.
 Xeno-canto: audio recordings of the African pygmy kingfisher

African pygmy kingfisher
African pygmy kingfisher
African pygmy kingfisher
African pygmy kingfisher
Birds of East Africa